A political crisis in the Maldives intensified on after President Abdulla Yameen decided to disobey the Supreme Court order to release 9 political prisoners and reinstating 12 parliament members which will give the opposition control of the chamber and potentially paving the way for Yameen's impeachment.

On 5 February 2018 president Abdulla Yameen declared a state of emergency and ordered the arrest of two judges of the Supreme Court of the Maldives, including Chief Justice of the Maldives Abdulla Saeed and justice Ali Hameed Mohamed and former President (also his half-brother) Maumoon Abdul Gayoom.

Events

February 1, 2018
After a few hours after the Supreme Court released the court order on its website. The state-owned TV channel Television Maldives and Channel 13 owned by president Abdulla Yameen went to discredit the order by saying the Supreme Court website was hacked. The Supreme Court immediately responded by tweeting the website is not hacked.

Maldivian Democratic Party was already holding a small peaceful gathering in front of their campaign headquarters who heard the news and many broke into tears including some Parliament members. They announced a gathering to be held on February 2, 2018 that night at 2:00 a.m.

Cabinet ministers question authenticity of the court order and said that they have not been able to be in contact with the Supreme Court and they are trying to get direct communication with the justices.

President Abdulla Yameen fired the Commissioner of Police Ahmed Areef and replaced by Ahmed Saudhee, claiming that Areef was not attending his phone calls. Ahmed Saudhee also fired back by saying that he was trying to follow the court orders and president Yameen did not allow him to do his job.

The opposition held a peaceful rally 2 a.m midnight to celebrate the court ruling. Maldives Police Service an hour after the rally started used tear gas and pepper spray to disperse the crowd and leaving many affected.

February 3, 2018
The opening of People's Majlis was cancelled for security reasons and was being rescheduled as soon as it was possible.

President Abdulla Yameen fires Acting-Commissioner of Police Ahmed Saudhee, and gave no clear reason why he fired Saudhee. Presidents office staff released a small statement only saying:

President Abdulla Yameen hold a rally and officially announce his re-election and say he was not expecting the Supreme Court ruling, the state and all relevant authorities have to do a lot of work to see how to implement it.

Special Operations Police were posted outside the Chief Justice of the Maldives, Abdulla Saeeds house. Upon hearing rumours he was about to be arrested the public gathered and had clashes with Special Operations Police the people who gathered were backed off successfully and Special Operations Police Maldives Police Service released the statement they were not going to be arresting Justice Abdulla Saeed

February 4, 2018
Attorney general alongside acting-police commissioner Abdulla Nawaz and Chief of Defence Force Ahmed Shiyam holds press conference saying they will not obey any order to impeach president Abdulla Yameen.

Secretary General of the parliament Ahmed Mohamed resigns citing “personal reasons.”

Opposition lawmakers submit no-confidence motion against prosecutor general, Aishath Bisham, attorney general, Mohamed Anil, home minister, Azleen Ahmed, and defence minister, Adam Shareef for their refusal to comply with the Supreme Court order.

February 5, 2018
Criminal Court orders the immediate release of Faris Maumoon from detention.

President Abdulla Yameen declares a state of emergency for 15 days, Suspension of 20 constitutional rights, and the Criminal Procedures Act and parts of the Judges Act.

Maldivian military forces gather around the supreme court and try to break into the court by forcing the gate open.

Former president Maumoon Abdul Gayoom and his son-in-law Moamed Nadheem got arrest on charges of trying to overthrow the government

February 6, 2018
After multiple attempts to break into the supreme court special operations climbed up the roof of the high court (same building) and broke the windows of the supreme court and forced justice Ali Hameed and dragged chief justice Abdulla Saeed on the floor out of the supreme court.

Former president Mohamed Nasheed requests India’s intervention.

State of emergency amended to suspend more legal rights, including the right to remain silent and be brought before a judge within 24 hours.

Ibrahim Siyad Qasim, son of opposition leader Qasim Ibrahim arrested.

Response
Former President Mohamed Nasheed, currently in exile in the UK, called for India to send a military-backed diplomatic mission to compel the release of political detainees, and for the US and UK to freeze the financial transaction of Maldivian government officials. The Indian government stated that they regard the situation as "disturbing". The Times of India reported that the Indian Armed Forces were on standby for "deployment at short notice" on potential operations in Maldives, ranging from the evacuation of nationals to a military intervention akin to that in the 1988 Operation Cactus.

See also
2011-12 Maldives political crisis

References

2018 in the Maldives
Maldives